William Daniel Leahy  (May 6, 1875 – July 20, 1959)  was an American naval officer who was the most senior United States military officer on active duty during World War II. He held multiple titles and had considerable influence over foreign and military policy throughout the war. As a fleet admiral, he was the first flag officer ever to hold a five-star rank in the U.S. Armed Forces.

An 1897 graduate of the Annapolis, Leahy saw active service in the Spanish–American War, the Philippine–American War, the Boxer Rebellion in China, the Banana Wars, and World War I. He was the first member of his cadet class to reach flag rank, as the Chief of the Bureau of Ordnance from 1927 to 1931. He subsequently served as Chief of the Bureau of Navigation from 1933 to 1936, and commanded the Battle Fleet from 1936 to 1937. As Chief of Naval Operations from 1937 to 1939, he was the senior officer in the United States Navy, overseeing the expansion of the fleet and preparations for war.

After retiring from the Navy, Leahy was appointed the governor of Puerto Rico in 1939 by President Franklin D. Roosevelt. In his most controversial role, he served as the Ambassador to France from 1940 to 1942. American policy was aimed at keeping the government of Vichy France free of German control, but Leahy had limited success. He came to believe that the United States was backing the wrong side, and asked to be recalled after the Japanese attack on Pearl Harbor brought the United States into the war.

Leahy was recalled to active duty as the Chief of Staff to the President in 1942 and served in that position through the rest of World War II. He was the highest-ranking active-duty member of the military. He was the de facto first Chairman of the Joint Chiefs of Staff and as such oversaw all of the American armed forces. He also presided over the American delegation to the Combined Chiefs of Staff. He was a major decision-maker during the war and was second only to the President in authority and influence. He was promoted to five star rank in December 1944. He served Roosevelt's successor Harry S. Truman, helping shape postwar foreign policy until finally retiring in 1949.

Early life and education

William Daniel Leahy was born in Hampton, Iowa, on May 6, 1875, the first of seven children of Michael Anthony Leahy, a lawyer and American Civil War veteran, who was elected to the Iowa Legislature in 1872, and his wife Rose Mary  Hamilton. Both parents were born in the United States but his grandparents were immigrants from Ireland. He had five brothers and a sister. His father was re-elected in 1874, but moved to Wausau, Wisconsin in 1882. In 1889, the family moved again, this time to Ashland, Wisconsin, where Leahy attended high school. His nose was broken in an American football match and his family lacked the money to get it fixed, so it remained crooked for the rest of his life.

Leahy wanted to attend the United States Military Academy at West Point, New York, but this required an Congressional appointment, and Leahy was unable to secure one. His local Congressman, Thomas Lynch, offered Leahy an appointment to the United States Naval Academy in Annapolis, Maryland, which was much less popular among boys in the landlocked Midwestern United States. Leahy passed the entrance examinations and was admitted as a naval cadet in May 1893.

He graduated 35th out of 47 in the class of 1897. His class was the most successful ever: five of its members would reach four-star rank while on active duty: Leahy, Thomas C. Hart, Arthur J. Hepburn, Orin G. Murfin and Harry E. Yarnell. , no other class had had more than four.

Naval service

Spanish-American War
Until 1912 naval cadets graduating from Annapolis had to complete two years' duty at sea and pass examinations before they could be commissioned as ensigns. Leahy was assigned to the battleship , which was then at Vancouver, British Columbia for celebrations of Queen Victoria's Diamond Jubilee. He was on board when she made a dash through the Strait of Magellan, and around South America in the spring of 1898 to participate in the Spanish–American War. The Oregon took part in the blockade and bombardment of Santiago and shelled the small town of Guantánamo, which Leahy felt was "unnecessary and cruel". In the Battle of Santiago on July 3, Leahy was in command of the ship's forward turret. This was the only naval battle Leahy witnessed in person.

Seeking further action, Leahy volunteered to serve on the gunboat , which was bound for the war in the Pacific, traveling via the Mediterranean Sea and the Suez Canal, but he got only as far as Ceylon when he received orders to report to Annapolis for his final ensign's examinations. He reached Annapolis in June 1899. He passed his examinations, and was commissioned as an ensign on July 1, 1899. After few weeks' leave, spent with his parents in Wisconsin, and a few months' service on the cruiser  at the Mare Island Navy Yard, he joined the monitor  on October 12, 1899. A week later it set sail for the Philippines. It arrived in Manila on November 24, and Leahy rejoined the crew of the Castine five days later.

China and Philippine–American Wars
On December 17, 1899, Castine sailed for Nagasaki, but it developed engine trouble on February 12 and stopped in Shanghai to make repairs. While it was there the Boxer Rebellion broke out in China, and it was retained in Shanghai to help British, French and Japanese forces guard the city, although Leahy did not like their chances if the 4,500 Chinese troops in the vicinity joined the uprising, as they had in the Battle of Tientsin. On August 28, the Castine was ordered to Amoy help protect American interests there against the possibility of a Japanese coup. After the threat had passed, the Castine returned to the Philippines, arriving back in Manila on September 16, 1900.

The Philippine–American War was still ongoing, and the Castine supported American operations on Marinduque and Iloilo. Leahy was appalled by American brutality and the widespread use of torture. Still an ensign, he was given his first command, the gunboat , a refitted ex-Spanish vessel. It had a crew of 23. His period in command ended when the Mariveles lost one of its propellers and had to be laid up for repairs. While in the Philippines he passed the examinations required for promotion to lieutenant, junior grade, and was promoted to that rank on July 1, 1902. He made his final trip to the Philippines in September 1902,and returned to the United States later that year.

Sea duty alternated with duty ashore. Leahy was assigned to the training ship  in San Francisco, where he was promoted to lieutenant on December 31, 1903. He met and courted Louise Tennent Harrington. Leahy married Louise on February 3, 1904. Louise subsequently convinced him to convert to Episcopalianism.

Leahy helped commission the cruiser  but swapped assignments with an officer on the  so that he could remain in San Francisco with Louise, who was pregnant. Over the next two years the Boston cruised back and forth between San Francisco and Panama, where the Panama Canal was under construction. He was in Acapulco when their son and only child, William Harrington Leahy, was born on October 27, 1904, and did not see his son until five months later. He was present for the 1906 San Francisco earthquake. His family had to leave their house in the face of the resulting fires. It survived undamaged, although they had to live in a hotel for several months before they could return.

On February 22, 1907, Leahy returned to Annapolis as instructor in the department of physics and chemistry. He also coached the academy rifle team. After two years ashore, he received orders on August 14, 1909, to return to San Francisco and sea duty as navigator of the armored cruiser , commanded by Captain Henry T. Mayo, in whom Leahy found a patron and a role model. In September, the California was one of eight ships that paid an official visit to Japan, where Leahy saw Admiral Heihachirō Tōgō. Mayo switched Leahy's assignment from navigator to gunnery officer.

Leahy was promoted to lieutenant commander on September 15, 1909, and in January 1911, the commander-in-chief of the Pacific Fleet, Rear Admiral Chauncey Thomas Jr., chose him as his fleet gunnery officer. In October, the California returned to San Francisco for a fleet review in honor of President William Howard Taft, and Leahy served as Taft's temporary naval aide for four days.

Banana Wars
Rear Admiral William H. H. Southerland succeeded Thomas as commander of the Pacific Fleet on April 21, 1912. The California sailed to Manila and then to Japan before returning to San Francisco on August 15. A few weeks later, Southerland received orders to proceed to Nicaragua and be prepared to deploy a landing force for the United States occupation of Nicaragua. In addition to his duties as gunnery officer, Leahy became the chief of staff of the expeditionary force and the commander of the small garrison at Corinto, Nicaragua. He came under fire while repeatedly escorting reinforcements and supplies over the railroad line to León. Privately, he thought that the United States was backing the wrong side, propping up a conservative elite who were exploiting the Nicaraguan people.

In October 1912, Leahy came ashore in Washington, D.C., as assistant director of gunnery exercises and engineering competitions. Then, in 1913, Mayo had him assigned to the Bureau of Navigation as a detail officer. Mayo and then his replacement, Rear Admiral William Fullam, were reassigned, leaving Leahy as the acting chief of the bureau. It was one of the Navy's most sensitive offices, as it controlled officer assignments. Leahy's wife Louise enjoyed the social milieu of Washington, and socialized with Addie Daniels, the wife of Josephus Daniels, the Secretary of the Navy. Leahy established a close friendship with the Assistant Secretary of the Navy, Franklin D. Roosevelt. 

Leahy assumed command of the Dolphin on September 18, 1915. The ship took part in the United States occupation of Haiti, where Leahy again acted as chief of staff, this time to Rear Admiral William B. Caperton. In May 1916, Dolphin participated in the occupation of the Dominican Republic too. During the summer, Roosevelt used it as his family yacht, cruising down the Hudson River from the Roosevelt family estate in Hyde Park, New York, and along the coast to his holiday house on Campobello Island. Leahy was promoted to commander on August 29, 1916.

World War I
Following the United States entry into World War I In April 1917, Dolphin was sent to the United States Virgin Islands to assert America's control there. There was a rumor that a Danish-flagged freighter in the vicinity, the Nordskov, was a German merchant raider in disguise, and Dolphin was sent to investigate. If it had been, Leahy would have been outgunned, but an inspection determined that the rumors were false. It was the Navy's newest battleship, but it was not sent to Europe due to teething troubles with its new design and a shortage of fuel oil in Britain.

Shortly before it was due to depart for France, Leahy was summoned to Washington, D.C., by the Chief of Naval Operations (CNO), Admiral William S. Benson, who offered him the position of the Navy's director of gunnery. Leahy told him that he wanted to remain on the Princess Matoika. A compromise was reached; Leahy was permitted to cross the Atlantic once before becoming director of gunnery. Traveling in convoy, the Princess Matoika reached Brest on May 23, 1918, and disembarked its troops. Leahy was awarded the Navy Cross "for distinguished service in the line of his profession as Commanding Officer of the USS Princess Matoika, engaged in the important, exacting and hazardous duty of transporting and escorting troops and supplies to European ports through waters infested with enemy submarines and mines during World War I."

Leahy returned to the United States, where he was promoted to captain on July 1, 1918, and soon after was on his way back to Europe to confer with representatives of the Royal Navy and discuss their gunnery practices. He reached London later that month, where he reported to the U.S. Navy commander in Europe, Vice Admiral William S. Sims, who had been a critic of the Navy's gunnery in the Spanish-American War. Leahy met with his British counterpart, Captain Frederic Dreyer, and the chief gunnery officer of the Anglo-American Grand Fleet, Captain Ernle Chatfield.

Leahy was attached to the staff of Rear Admiral Hugh Rodman, the commander of the American division of the Grand Fleet, and was able to view a gunnery exercise from the British battleship . On the way home he visited Paris, where he was appalled at the German use of a long-range gun to bombard the city, which he considered an indiscriminate targeting of civilians and militarily useless.

Sea duty between the wars

In February 1921, Leahy sailed for Europe, where he assumed command of the cruiser  on April 2. In May he was ordered to take command of the cruiser , the flagship of the naval detachment in Turkish waters during the Greco-Turkish War. He was able to spend a couple of weeks in the French countryside with Louise, who spoke fluent French, before taking the Orient Express to Constantinople, where he reported to the American commander there, Rear Admiral Mark L. Bristol, on May 30. Leahy had the role of safeguarding American interests in Turkey. He had to play the diplomat, attending parties and receptions, and organizing American events. He reveled in this assignment.

The next step in a successful naval career would normally have been to attend the Naval War College. Leahy submitted repeated requests but was never sent. At the end of 1921, he was given command of the minelayer  and concurrent command of Mine Squadron One. He then returned to Washington, D.C., where he served as director of Officer Personnel in the Bureau of Navigation from 1923 to 1926. After three years of shore duty, he was given command of the battleship . In biennial competitions in gunnery, engineering and battle efficiency, the New Mexico won all three in 1927–1928.

Flag officer
On October 14, 1927, he reached flag rank, the first member of his cadet class to do so, and returned to Washington as the Chief of the Bureau of Ordnance. The following year he bought a town house on Florida Avenue near Dupont Circle for $20,000. He also had assets that he had acquired through his marriage to Louise: stocks in the Colusa County Bank and agricultural land in the Sacramento Valley in California. In the wake of the Wall Street Crash of 1929, President Herbert Hoover determined to effect cuts in the Navy's budget, and his representative, Rear Admiral William V. Pratt, negotiated the London Naval Treaty that limited naval construction. The list of canceled ships included two aircraft carriers, three cruisers, a destroyer and six submarines. Leahy was in charge of implementing these cuts, and he was appalled at the human toll; some 5,000 workers lost their jobs, many of them highly skilled shipyard workers who faced long-term unemployment during the Great Depression.

Admiral Charles F. Hughes elected to retire rather than enforce the cuts, and he was replaced by Pratt. Pratt and Leahy soon clashed over cuts to shipbuilding, and Pratt attempted to have Leahy reassigned as chief of staff of the Pacific Fleet. Leahy had the Chief of the Bureau of Navigation block this, but decided that it would be in his best interest to get away from Pratt, and he secured command of the destroyers of the Scouting Force on the West Coast in 1931. Leahy's dislike of Hoover was intensified by his dire personal circumstances. He could not find a tenant for the Florida Avenue property at a rent that would pay for its upkeep; the price of food had fallen so much that his land in the Sacramento Valley could not generate a profit, and was seized by the government to recover unpaid taxes; and a run on the bank in January 1933 caused the Colusa County Bank to close its doors, taking with it Leahy's life savings, and leaving him with a large debt that he would not pay off until 1941.

Roosevelt was inaugurated as president on March 2, 1933, and he nominated Leahy as the Chief of the Bureau of Navigation. On May 6, 1933, Leahy and Louise boarded a train back to Washington, D.C.. As bureau chief, Leahy handled personnel matters with care and consideration. When his successor as the Chief of the Bureau of Ordnance, Rear Admiral Edgar B. Larimer, suffered a mental breakdown and was hospitalized, Leahy ensured that he was kept on the active list until he reached retirement age, thereby safeguarding his pension.

Leahy formed a good working relationship with the new Assistant Secretary of the Navy, Henry L. Roosevelt, an Annapolis graduate and distant cousin of the President whom Leahy considered a close personal friend, but he clashed with the new CNO, Admiral William H. Standley, who sought to assert the power of the CNO over the bureau chiefs. In this he was opposed by Leahy and the Chief of the Bureau of Aeronautics, Rear Admiral Ernest J. King, who enlisted the aid of Henry Roosevelt and the Secretary of the Navy, Claude A. Swanson, to block it. In 1936, the commander-in-chief United States Fleet (CINCUS), Admiral Joseph M. Reeves recommended Leahy for the position of Commander Battleships Battle Force, with the rank of vice admiral. Standley was opposed to this, but was unable to persuade Swanson or the President, who invited Leahy to a private chat at the White House before proceeding to take up his new posting.

Leahy assumed his new command on July 13, 1935. In October Roosevelt came out to California for the California Pacific International Exposition. Leahy treated him to the largest fleet maneuver the U.S. Navy had ever carried out, with 129 warships, including 12 battleships, participating, which the President observed from the deck of the cruiser . On March 30, 1936, Leahy was promoted to the temporary rank of admiral and hoisted his four-star flag on the battleship  as Commander Battle Force. One of his last acts in this post was a symbolic one: he transferred his flag to the aircraft carrier  as a sign of his conviction that aircraft were now an integral part of sea power.

Chief of Naval Operations
In December 1935, Swanson told Leahy in confidence that he would be appointed the next CNO if Roosevelt won the 1936 presidential election. Roosevelt won the election with a landslide victory, and on November 10, 1936, it was announced that he would succeed Standley as CNO on January 1, 1937. As CNO, Leahy was content to let the bureau chiefs function as they always had, with the CNO acting as a primus inter pares. Swanson was chronically ill, and Henry Roosevelt died on February 22, 1936. Charles Edison became the new assistant secretary, but he lacked experience in naval affairs.

Leahy began representing the Navy in cabinet meetings. He met with the President frequently; during his tenure as CNO, Roosevelt had 52 meetings with Leahy, compared with twelve with his Army counterpart, General Malin Craig, and none the meetings with Craig were private lunches. Meetings between Leahy and Roosevelt were sometimes on matters unrelated to the Navy, and they frequently went on for hours. At one private lunch on April 15, 1937, Leahy and Roosevelt debated whether new battleships should have 16-inch  or (cheaper) 14-inch guns. Leahy ultimately persuaded the President that the new s should have 16-inch guns. On May 22, Leahy accompanied the President and dignitaries including John Nance Garner, Harry Hopkins, James F. Byrnes, Morris Sheppard, Edwin C. Johnson, Claude Pepper and Sam Rayburn on a cruise on the presidential yacht  to watch a baseball game between congressmen and the press.

The most important issue confronting the administration was how to respond to the Japanese invasion of China. The commander-in-chief of the Asiatic Fleet, Admiral Harry Yarnell, asked for four additional cruisers to help evacuate American citizens from the Shanghai International Settlement, but the Secretary of State, Cordell Hull, thought this would be too provocative. Leahy went to Hyde Park to take the matter up with Roosevelt. The request was turned down: American isolationist sentiment was too strong to countenance the risk of being drawn into the conflict; Yarnell could use merchant ships, if he could find them. Leahy accepted this presidential decision, as he always did, even when he strongly disagreed. Leahy wrote in his diary that a Japanese threat to bomb the civilian population in China was "evidence, and a conclusive one, that the old accepted rules of warfare are no longer in effect."

On December 12, Leahy was informed of the USS Panay incident, in which an American gunboat on the Yangtze River had been sunk by Japanese aircraft. He met with Hull to craft a response, and discussed the matter with Roosevelt on December 14. Leahy saw the Panay incident as a test of American resolve. He wanted to answer it with a show of force, economic sanctions and a naval blockade of Japan. But among Roosevelt's advisors, he was the only one willing to countenance such a drastic step. Roosevelt agreed with him, but in an election year he felt he could not afford to antagonize the pacifists and isolationists. The Japanese apology therefore was accepted.

The Panay incident did prompt Roosevelt and Leahy to press ahead with plans for an ambitious shipbuilding program. On January 5, Roosevelt, Leahy and Edison met with Congressman Carl Vinson to draw up a strategy for obtaining Congressional approval for a 20 percent increase in all classes of warships. The resulting Second Vinson Act was approved in May 1938, and provided for four more s. Leahy had not thought it worthwhile to build more aircraft carriers, but five were added to what became the Two-Ocean Navy Act, together with five s. Leahy pushed for the construction of 24  oilers, which would be needed to project American sea power across the Pacific.

Roosevelt threw a surprise party for Leahy on July 28, 1939, during which he presented him with the Navy Distinguished Service Medal. According to Leahy, Roosevelt said: "Bill, if we have a war, you're going to be right back here helping me run it." To make this easier, legislation was expedited to keep Leahy on the active list for another two years. On August 1, 1939, Admiral Harold Stark replaced Leahy as CNO.

Government service

Governor of Puerto Rico

From September 1939 to November 1940, Leahy served as Governor of Puerto Rico after Roosevelt removed Blanton Winship for his role in the Ponce massacre. Winship had aligned himself with the Coalición, a pro-American electoral alliance that represented the interests of the island's wealthy elite and American sugar corporations. Roosevelt gave Leahy the objectives of developing and upgrading base installations, and of alleviating the extreme poverty and inequality. Leahy was given an additional $10 million (equivalent to $ million in ) and extraordinary latitude in spending it. Leahy was named as the head of the Puerto Rican office of the Works Progress Administration (WPA), which gave him control over New Deal funding. In October 1939, he also became the head of the Puerto Rico Cement Corporation in order to help it secure a $700,000 loan from the Federal government's Reconstruction Finance Corporation (RFC), and in December he became the head of the Puerto Rican branch of the RFC. His power was enhanced by his direct access to the President and the Secretary of the interior, Harold L. Ickes.

Although given the unflattering sobriquet Almirante Lija ("Admiral Sandpaper") by locals, based on his surname, Leahy was regarded as one of the most lenient American governors of the several who served Puerto Rico in the first half of the 20th century. He took an open stance of not intervening directly in local politics, although he remained involved in Federal politics, doing what he could to support Roosevelt's 1940 reelection. He attempted to understand and respect local customs, and initiated various major public works projects. Although his priority was developing Puerto Rico as a military base, over half the WPA funds were spent on public works such as roads and improving sanitation. He regulated prices and production in the coffee industry, and had ships traveling between the United States and the Panama Canal, where major upgrade works were being undertaken, stop over in Puerto Rico when they needed repairs or supplies. In December 1939 he met with Roosevelt and secured an additional $100 million in WPA funding (equivalent to $ million in ) for public works, which allowed him to hire another 20,000 workers. By awarding lucrative government contracts and appointing officials based on Roosevelt's preferences rather than those of the local elite, he soon earned the enmity of the Coalición.

Leahy oversaw the development of military bases and stations across the island. At the time of his appointment as governor, the only naval installations were a radio station and a hydrographic office. On October 30, 1939, a fixed fee contract was awarded for construction of the Naval Air Station Isla Grande. Subsequently the scope of activity was widened to include the Roosevelt Roads Naval Station. Construction work on the Roosevelt Roads Naval Station commenced in 1941 under another fixed fee contract and the base was commissioned on July 15, 1943.

Between January 1 and November 1, 1940, Leahy met with Roosevelt six times. One of the most important was a lunch on October 6, 1940. Admiral James O. Richardson, the CINCUS, had been ordered to keep the Pacific Fleet at Pearl Harbor at the conclusion of exercises there to act as a deterrent to the Japanese. Richardson protested that Pearl Harbor, he argued, was unsuitable as a base; it could not provide the needs of the fleet for an extended stay, which would affect its readiness, and was too vulnerable to a surprise attack. Leahy agreed, but knew better than to press the matter with Roosevelt when his mind was made up. On February 1, 1941, Richardson was recalled and replaced as CINCUS by Admiral Husband Kimmel.

Ambassador to France
Henry L. Stimson and McGeorge Bundy described Fall of France in June 1940 as "the most shocking single event of the war". American security had been underwritten by Britain and France, allowing the United States to have a comparatively low amount of defense spending, and planning was based on the assumption that France would be a bulwark against Germany, as it had been in World War I, and that the United States would have ample time to mobilize industry and create armies. Now, with France gone, Germany could directly threaten the United States. On November 18, 1940, Leahy was appointed United States Ambassador to France. In his message asking Leahy to accept the position, Roosevelt explained: 

Leahy went to Washington, D.C., to confer with Roosevelt, who told him that he needed to gain the confidence of the Vichy French head of state, Marshal Philippe Pétain, and the Commander-in-Chief of the French Navy, Admiral François Darlan. "My major task", Leahy later recalled "was to keep the French on our side in so far as possible". The United States would give Britain all the help it could short of actually joining the war, and Leahy would convince Pétain and Darlan that it was in France's best interest that Germany be defeated. He departed Norfolk, Virginia, on the cruiser  on December 17, 1940, and presented his letter of credence to Pétain in Vichy on January 9, 1941.

Leahy had some levers with which to influence the French. The United States supplied food and medical aid to the  regime in French North Africa, hoping in return to moderate its collaboration with the Axis Powers. After six months of negotiations, the British agreed to permit medical supplies to be shipped. Food was another matter; it was estimated that 22 million French people did not get enough to eat, but the British believed that Germany would seize up to 58 percent of France's food crops. Darlan blamed the British blockade, and he threatened to use the French Navy to break it.

Leahy advised Roosevelt that the shipment of supplies to France would improve America's standing and stiffen Pétain's resolve to resist German demands, In his opinion, the "British blockade action which prevents the delivery of necessary foodstuffs to the inhabitants of unoccupied France is of the same order of stupidity as many other British policies in the present war." He also hoped that aid to French North Africa would strengthen the hand of General Maxime Weygand. Roosevelt compelled the British to accept the shipment of medicine and food intended for children, along with thousands of tons of fuel for their distribution.

American aid proved insufficient to buy French support. In May 1941, Darlan agreed to the Paris Protocols, which granted Germany access to French military bases in Syria, Tunisia, and French West Africa, and in July the French granted Japan access to bases in French Indochina, which directly threatened the American position in the Philippines. Although no German bombers had the range to bomb the United States from bases in Senegal, if they could deploy from Senegal to Vichy-held Martinique, they could do so from there.

Weygand, the main American hope for a change in French policy, was recalled on November 18, despite Leahy's warnings that this could prompt a cession of American aid. On December 7, 1941, Leahy received news of the Japanese attack on Pearl Harbor. This was followed, on December 11, by the German declaration of war against the United States. With the United States now in the war, Leahy thought that this would strengthen his hand with the Vichy government, but Charles de Gaulle's capture of Saint Pierre and Miquelon later that month discredited American assurances that French colonies would not be seized.

By this time Leahy was convinced that the United States was backing the wrong side, and he urged Roosevelt to use this as a pretext for recalling him to the United States. This was finally prompted by the formation of a new government in Vichy under the pro-Axis Pierre Laval on April 18. Meanwhile, on April 9, Leahy's wife Louise underwent a hysterectomy. While recovering from the operation, she suffered an embolism and died on April 21. Leahy called on Pétain to say farewell on April 27. He arrived back in New York on the Swedish-registered ocean liner  on June 1. He arranged for a funeral service for Louise at the St. Thomas Episcopal Church, where they had been members for many years, and watched her burial in Arlington National Cemetery on June 3, 1942.

Chief of Staff to the Commander in Chief

Organization and role
Waging a two-ocean war as part of a coalition revealed serious deficiencies in the organization of the American high command when it came to formulating grand strategy: meetings of the senior officers of the Army and Navy with each other and with the President were irregular and infrequent, and there was no joint planning staff or secretariat to record decisions taken. Under the Constitution of the United States, the President was the Commander in Chief of the Army and Navy. At a meeting with Roosevelt on February 24, 1942, the Chief of Staff of the United States Army, General George C. Marshall, urged Roosevelt to appoint a chief of staff of the armed forces to provide unity of command, and he suggested Leahy for the role. Leahy had lunch with Roosevelt on July 7, during which this was discussed. On July 21, Leahy was recalled to active duty. He resigned as Ambassador to France and was appointed Chief of Staff to the Commander in Chief of the Army and Navy. In announcing the appointment, Roosevelt described Leahy's role as an advisory one rather than that of a supreme commander.

Leahy attended his first meeting of the Joint Chiefs of Staff (JCS) on July 28. The other members were Marshall; King, who was now both CNO and Commander in Chief, U.S. Fleet (now abbreviated as COMINCH); and Lieutenant General Henry H. Arnold, the Chief of U.S. Army Air Forces. Henceforth, the JCS held regular meetings at noon on Wednesdays, which usually commenced with a light lunch. Leahy served as the de facto chairman. He drew up the agenda for the JCS meetings, presided over them, and signed off on all the major papers and decisions. He considered that this was due to his seniority and not by virtue of his position. He had a small personal staff of two military aides-de-camp and two or three secretaries. JCS meetings were held in the Public Health Service Building, where Leahy had an office. After some renovations were made, he was also given an office in the East Wing of the White House on September 7, 1942; the other two main offices there were occupied by Hopkins and Byrnes. Roosevelt had the Map Room constructed in the White House where large maps showed the progress of the war. Only Leahy and Hopkins had unrestricted access to the Map Room; everyone else had to be accompanied by Leahy or Hopkins or given special permission to enter.

Two days after his first JCS meeting, there was a meeting of the Combined Chiefs of Staff (CCS), which Leahy also chaired. In these meetings the JCS met with the leaders of the British Joint Staff Mission: Field Marshal Sir John Dill, Admiral Sir Andrew Cunningham, Air Marshal Douglas Evill and Lieutenant General Gordon Macready. CCS meetings were held every Friday. The main agendum item at his first JCS and CCS meetings was Operation Gymnast, a proposed invasion of French North Africa. Marshall and King were opposed to it on the grounds that it would divert resources necessary for Operation Roundup, a landing in northern France, but after listening to their arguments, Leahy informed them Roosevelt was adamant that it was vital American forces take the field against Germany in 1942, and that Gymnast was to proceed. Roosevelt gave his formal assent on July 25. Marshall and King considered this to be tentative, but Leahy informed them that the decision was final.

Leahy usually arrived at his White House office sometime between 08:30 and 08:45 each day and went over copies of dispatches and reports. For convenience, the documents were color coded: pink for incoming dispatches from the theater; yellow for outgoing ones; green for JCS papers; white for CCS ones; and blue for papers from the Joint Staff Planners. Leahy would select the papers to be brought to the President's attention, and would meet with him each morning in the Oval Office or the Map Room. This included high-grade Ultra intelligence. Control of the flow of information gave Leahy an additional source of power and influence beyond his personal relationship with the President.

Grand strategy 
When Roosevelt went away, Leahy went with him. Leahy missed the Casablanca Conference in January 1943; after setting out with Roosevelt, Hopkins and Rear Admiral Ross McIntire, Leahy developed bronchitis and had to remain in Trinidad. But he was present at all the other inter-Allied conferences that the President attended. Leahy's support of Roosevelt's decision to invade French North Africa did not mean that he bought into the British Mediterranean strategy. He joined Marshall and King in their advocacy of a cross-Channel operation in 1944. At the first conference he attended, the Third Washington Conference, in May 1943 he clashed with the British chiefs of staff over their reluctance to undertake operations to reopen the overland route to China, which Leahy considered vital to both the war against Japan and the postwar era. Leahy eventually extracted a promise from the British to undertake Operation Anakim, an offensive to recapture Burma, in 1943. Leahy sided with Hopkins and Major General Claire Chennault in supporting a bombing offensive against Japan from bases in China despite Marshall's prescient warnings that this could not be sustained without adequate ground troops to protect the air bases. Marshall was proven correct when a Japanese offensive overran Chennault's bases.

On November 12, 1943, Roosevelt, Hopkins, Leahy, King and Marshall set off together from Hampton Roads on the battleship . Roosevelt occupied the captain's cabin, and Leahy the one for an embarked admiral; Marshall, the next most senior officer, had the chief of staff's cabin. The President had his own mess, where he dined with Hopkins, Leahy, McIntire, and Roosevelt's aides, Rear Admiral Wilson Brown and Major General Edwin "Pa" Watson; the other senior officers took their meals with the ship's officers. They reached Mers-el-Kebir on November 20, from whence they flew to Tunis and then Cairo. Roosevelt stayed at the American Ambassador's compound in Cairo. Space was limited, so he took only Leahy and Hopkins with him. Discussions with the British in Cairo were mainly concerned with Burma and China, about which they had much less interest than the Americans.

They then flew on to Tehran, Iran, for talks with Stalin. Roosevelt was slated to stay at the American legation there, but Stalin offered to put Roosevelt up at the Soviet compound. He was allowed to bring two people with him, so he chose Leahy and Hopkins. The conference reached agreement with the Soviets on the cross-Channel operation (Operation Overlord) and an invasion of Southern France (Operation Anvil). When General Sir Alan Brooke began to back away from the commitment, Leahy finally lost his patience and demanded to know under what circumstances he would be willing to undertake Overlord. In the end, the British, as Leahy put it, "fell into line".

Although the conservative Leahy regarded Hopkins as a "pinko", the two men worked well together, and Leahy became quite fond of Hopkins. Both were completely devoted to the President, and Leahy saw something of himself in the idealistic Hopkins. Over time, Leahy gradually replaced Hopkins as Roosevelt's most trusted advisor, becoming, in the words of historian Phillips O'Brien, "the second most powerful man in the world". The main reason for this was the precarious state of Hopkins's health. Hopkins was diagnosed with stomach cancer, and in December 1937, doctors removed three quarters of his stomach. He married Louise Gill Macy in the Oval office on July 30, 1942. For a time she lived in the White House with Hopkins, but she prevailed on him to move out in December 1943. He was therefore no longer at Roosevelt's beck and call.

Leahy spent D-Day, June 6, 1944, in his home town of Hampton, Iowa. This well-publicized "sentimental journey" was part of the deception efforts surrounding the Allied invasion of Europe. The idea was to lull any German agents in the United States into believing that the operation would not take place while such an important officer was out of the capital. The following month, he accompanied Roosevelt to the Pacific Strategy Conference in Hawaii at which they met with Admiral Chester W. Nimitz, the commander in chief of the Pacific Ocean Areas, and General Douglas MacArthur, the commander in chief of the Southwest Pacific Area.

Roosevelt, Leahy and presidential speech writer Samuel Rosenman (instead of Hopkins) set out from Washington in Roosevelt's personal railcar, the Ferdinand Magellan, on July 13. They went to Hyde Park, where Roosevelt showed Leahy around his Presidential Library, then to Chicago, where Roosevelt conferred with leaders of the Democratic Party over the choice of Harry S. Truman as his vice presidential running mate in the 1944 election. In San Diego they boarded the cruiser , which took them to Hawaii, where Nimitz briefed them on a proposed invasion of the island of Formosa, King's preferred target, but also spoke favorably of MacArthur's alternative of liberating the Philippines. Leahy hoped that this would facilitate a naval and air blockade that would make an invasion of Japan unnecessary. No decision was taken at this time, and the JCS continued debating the issue for months before authorizing the liberation of Luzon on October 3.

Hopkins was not present at the Second Quebec Conference in September 1944 either, continuing Leahy's transformation into a White House advisor. He did not attend the political sessions at Quebec, but at this level political and military issues were indistinguishable. For example, the JCS examined a proposal for a British fleet to participate in the Pacific War, a military proposal with a political objective. King was unenthusiastic about the idea; the U.S. Navy was performing well against the Japanese, and the addition of British forces would complicate command and logistics arrangements. Leahy and Marshall pressed for the British offer to be accepted, and in the end it was, with the proviso that the British Pacific Fleet would be self-supporting.

Another debate concerned the American occupation zone in Germany. The United States was allocated the southern part of Germany, which meant that its lines of communications would run through France, where Leahy was concerned about the prospect of a postwar Communist takeover. Roosevelt and Churchill reached a compromise, whereby the ports of Bremen and Bremerhaven would be given to the Americans, along with the right of transit through the British Zone.

Leahy was advanced to the newly-created rank of Fleet Admiral on December 15, 1944, making him the most senior of the seven men who received five-star rank that month. He accompanied President Roosevelt to the Yalta Conference in February 1945. The cruiser  took them to Malta, where Leahy chaired a CCS meeting to discuss the war against Germany, and then the President's personal aircraft, the Sacred Cow, flew them to Yalta. At Yalta, Roosevelt met Churchill and Stalin to decide how Europe was to be reorganized after the impending surrender of Germany.

On April 12, 1945, Roosevelt died. Leahy attended the ceremonies and the memorial service for his friend, which was held in the East Room of the White House.

Atomic bomb
On April 13, Leahy gave the regular morning briefing on the progress of the war to Truman, who had become President on Roosevelt's death. This was followed by a short meeting with the Joint Chiefs, the Secretary of War, Henry Stimson, and the Secretary of the Navy, James Forrestal. Afterwards, Leahy offered to resign, but Truman decided to retain him as chief of staff. On June 18, the Joint Chiefs, along with Stimson and Forrestal, met with Truman at the White House to discuss Operation Olympic, the planned invasion of Kyushu. Truman chaired the meeting. Marshall and King strongly favored the operation, and all the others voiced their support except Leahy, who feared that it would result in high casualties. He questioned Marshall's casualty estimates, which were based on the Luzon campaign, which took place on a large land mass where there was ample room for maneuver, rather than the Okinawa campaign, which took place on an island where lack of maneuver room resulted in frontal assaults and high casualties.

According to Truman's Memoirs: Year of Decisions, Leahy was present in 1945 when Truman was given advice by Vannevar Bush about the Manhattan Project:

After the bomb was tested, Truman consulted with Byrnes, Stimson, Leahy, Marshall, Arnold and Dwight D. Eisenhower, the commander of United States Forces, European Theater. The consensus was that the atomic bomb should be used. In his memoirs, Leahy wrote:

Historian Barton J. Bernstein noted that Leahy did not oppose its use at the time:

Truman administration
In July 1945, Leahy accompanied Truman to the Potsdam Conference where Truman met with Stalin and the new British Prime Minister Clement Attlee to make decisions about the governance of occupied Germany. Hopkins was too ill to make the journey. Leahy was disappointed in the outcome of these conferences. He considered that both Truman and Stalin had suffered defeats, with proposals that would have ensured a lasting peace in Europe being watered down or turned down. He recognized that the Soviet Union was a dominant power in Europe, and that the British Empire was in terminal decline, underscored by the mid-conference replacement of Churchill by Attlee.

On January 24, 1946, Leahy was appointed to the interim National Intelligence Authority (NIA), which oversaw activities of the nascent Central Intelligence Group. The following year the National Security Act of 1947 replaced these organizations with the National Security Council and the Central Intelligence Agency respectively, ending Leahy's involvement. He continued to chair meetings of the Joint Chiefs of Staff, and he rejected war plans that he felt placed too much emphasis on the first use of nuclear weapons.

Like many naval officers, he was opposed to the unification of the War and Navy departments into the Department of Defense, fearing that the Navy would lose its naval aviation and the Marine Corps. Nor did he agree with formalizing the role of Chairman of the Joint Chiefs of Staff, which he felt would place too much power in the hands of one individual. The position was created by amendments to the National Security Act that Truman signed into law on August 10, 1949, but the Chairman of the Joint Chiefs was not the single chief of staff the Army and Air Force wanted. 

Leahy was involved in the preparation of two speeches that marked the onset of the Cold War: Truman's Navy Day address on October 27, 1945, and Churchill's "Iron Curtain" speech on March 5, 1946. The former was written by Leahy and Rosenman, and reflected Leahy's ideas about the fundamental goals of U.S. foreign policy; the latter was written by Churchill, but in consultation with Leahy, who was the only one of the "American military men" referred to in the speech with whom Churchill discussed the speech. But Leahy's non-interventionist stance on U.S. involvement in the Greek Civil War and the Israeli–Palestinian conflict were increasingly out of step with the policies of the Truman administration. On September 20, 1948, columnist Constantine Brown published allegations that White House advisors Clark Clifford and David K. Niles were urging Truman to get rid of Leahy, whom they regarded, Brown said, as an "old-fashioned reactionary".

On the day after Truman won the presidential election on November 2, 1948, Leahy asked to be retired in January. In December, doctors diagnosed Leahy with a partial blockage of the kidneys. On December 28, he met with Truman as chief of staff for the last time. Truman officially accepted his resignation as his chief of staff on March 2, 1949, although as an officer with five-star rank, Leahy technically remained on active service as an advisor to the Secretary of the Navy.

The following year, Leahy published his war memoirs, I Was There. His unemotional, unexciting and unenlightening style did his publisher no favors. Orville Prescott the book reviewer for The New York Times wrote: "As the personal confidant of President Roosevelt and President Truman, Admiral Leahy ought to have a good story to tell. Unfortunately, he hasn't... its stiff official manner, its elaborate discretion, its desperate need of editing and its lack of any exciting new information make it dull and dusty fare... writes in a prose style as rigid as a naval cadet standing at attention in his review." The book sold poorly, and when Leahy subsequently proposed a book about his time in Puerto Rico, the publisher turned it down.

Death and legacy

Leahy died at the U.S. Naval Hospital in Bethesda, Maryland, on July 20, 1959, at the age of eighty-four. At the time of his death, he was the oldest officer on active duty in the history of the U.S. Navy. He was given an Armed Forces military funeral. His body was viewed at the Bethlehem Chapel at the Washington National Cathedral from noon on July 22 until noon on July 23. A funeral service was then held in the cathedral at 14:00, followed by the burial in Arlington National Cemetery. Honorary pallbearers were Fleet Admiral Chester W. Nimitz, Admiral Thomas C. Hart, Admiral Charles P. Snyder, Admiral Louis E. Denfeld, Admiral Arthur W. Radford, Vice Admiral Edward L. Cochrane, and Rear Admiral Henry Williams, all retired from service. Active military servicemen who were honorary pallbearers were Admiral Jerauld Wright, Admiral Robert L. Dennison, Rear Admiral Joseph H. Wellings, and close friend, William D. Hassett.

Leahy's papers are in the Naval History and Heritage Command and the Library of Congress in Washington, D.C.; some personal correspondence is held by the Wisconsin Historical Society. The , the lead ship of the s, was named in his honor.

Dates of rank
 United States Naval Academy naval cadet – Class of 1897, 35th of class of 47

Decorations and awards

Leahy was invested as an Honorary Knight Grand Cross of the Military Division of the Most Honorable Order of the Bath on November 21, 1945.

Bibliography

Notes

References

Further reading

 
 
 

1875 births
1959 deaths
Ambassadors of the United States to France
American five-star officers
American military personnel of the Banana Wars
American military personnel of the Boxer Rebellion
American military personnel of the Philippine–American War
American military personnel of the Spanish–American War
American people of Irish descent
Burials at Arlington National Cemetery
Chairmen of the Joint Chiefs of Staff
Chiefs of Naval Operations
Governors of Puerto Rico
Honorary Knights Grand Cross of the Order of the Bath
Military aides to the President of the United States
Military personnel from Iowa
People from Hampton, Iowa
Recipients of the Navy Cross (United States)
Recipients of the Navy Distinguished Service Medal
United States Naval Academy alumni
United States Navy admirals
United States Navy personnel of World War I
United States Navy World War II admirals
Writers from Iowa